The Oxford is a historic multiunit residential building in Waltham, Massachusetts.  The double triple decker apartment house was built in 1897, during the last major phase of development on the city's South Side, and is one of its only surviving houses of that type.  It has well-preserved Colonial Revival features, including a dentillated and modillioned cornice.  Its front entry is flanked by a pair of bowed window projections, and is sheltered by a portico supported by Tuscan columns.

The building was listed on the National Register of Historic Places in 1989.

See also
National Register of Historic Places listings in Waltham, Massachusetts

References

Apartment buildings on the National Register of Historic Places in Massachusetts
Colonial Revival architecture in Massachusetts
Residential buildings completed in 1897
Buildings and structures in Waltham, Massachusetts
National Register of Historic Places in Waltham, Massachusetts